Cnestus gravidus is a species of weevil found in Bangladesh, Sri Lanka, India, Myanmar, Laos, Thailand, Vietnam and China.

Description
Average body length is about 5.0 to 5.5 mm. Body with a bicolored pronotum where the apical half is black and basal half is orange. Procoxae is subcontiguous. Antennae with four funical segments and obliquely truncate club. The first antennal segment forms a circular costa. Coarse median pair of asperities are found on the anterior margin of the pronotum. Protibiae consists with 7 socketed teeth. There is a mesonotal mycangial tuft found on the pronotal base. Elytral disc is short and elytral declivity is obliquely truncate. Elytral interstriae is granulate with a median row of long erect hairs.

References 

Scolytinae
Insects of Sri Lanka
Beetles described in 1898